Strikeforce: Shamrock vs. Le was a mixed martial arts event co-promoted by Strikeforce and EliteXC. The event took place on Saturday, March 29, 2008 at the HP Pavilion in San Jose, California.

Background
The main card aired live on the Showtime premium cable channel.

The event originally featured the anticipated Gilbert Melendez vs. Josh Thomson, but it was called off because Thomson injured himself training.

Nick Diaz was also scheduled to fight but was pulled from the card due to undisclosed reasons.

Referees assigned for the event were Mario Yamasaki, Herb Dean and Jon Schorle.

Results

Fighter salaries
Below are the disclosed purses for each of the fighters :

MAIN CARD FIGHTERS
Frank Shamrock: $300,000 (no win bonus listed)
Cung Le: $200,000 (no win bonus listed)
Gilbert Melendez: $50,000 (defeated Gabe Lemley; no win bonus listed)
Joey Villasenor: $36,000 (defeated Ryan Jensen; win bonus was $18,000
Wayne Cole: $10,000 (defeated Mike Kyle; win bonus was $5,000)
Drew Fickett: $10,000 (defeated Jae Suk Lim; win bonus was $5,000)
Mike Kyle: $10,000 (lost to Wayne Cole)
Gabe Lemley: $7,000 (lost to Gilbert Melendez)
Billy Evangelista: $10,000 (defeated Marlon Sims; win bonus was $5,000)
Jae Suk Lim: $3,000 (lost to Drew Fickett)
Ryan Jensen: $6,000 (lost to Joey Villasenor)
Marlon Sims: $2,500 (lost to Billy Evangelista)

PRELIMINARY CARD FIGHTERS
Tiki Ghosn: $8,000 (defeated Luke Stewart; win bonus was $2,000)
Luke Stewart: $6,000 (lost to Tiki Ghosn)
Darren Uyenoyama: $4,000 (defeated Anthony Figueroa; win bonus was $2,000)
Jesse Jones: $2,150 (defeated Jesse Gillespie; win bonus was $500)
Anthony Figueroa: $2,000 (lost to Darren Uyenoyama)
Jesse Gillespie: $1,200 (lost to Jesse Jones)

DISCLOSED FIGHTER PAYROLL: $667,850

See also 
 Strikeforce (mixed martial arts)
 List of Strikeforce champions
 List of Strikeforce events
 List of EliteXC events
 2008 in Strikeforce

References

External links
Strikeforce Official website
Official EliteXC website

Shamrock vs. Le
2008 in mixed martial arts
Mixed martial arts in San Jose, California
2008 in sports in California